Chang Yen-shu (born 11 February 1979) is a Taiwanese professional table tennis player representing Taiwan.

Career highlights

Summer Olympic Games
2000, Sydney, men's singles, last 32
2000, Sydney, men's doubles, quarter final
World Championships
1999, Eindhoven, men's doubles, quarter final
2001, Osaka, men's doubles, semi final
2007, Zagreb, men's doubles, semi final
Pro Tour Grand Finals
2000, Kobe, men's doubles, semi final
2001, Hainan, men's doubles, quarter final
Pro Tour Meetings
1999, Doha, men's doubles, winner 
1999, Melbourne, men's doubles, runner-up 
1999, Bremen, men's doubles, winner 
1999, Prague, men's doubles, runner-up 
2000, Zagreb, men's doubles, winner 
2000, Kobe, men's doubles, runner-up 
2000, Toulouse, men's doubles, winner 
2001, Doha, men's doubles, winner 
2001, Fort Lauderdale, men's doubles, winner 
2008, Velenje, men's doubles, winner 
Asian Championships
1998, Osaka, men's doubles, quarter final
2000, Doha, men's doubles, winner 
2000, Doha, mixed doubles, semi final
2000, Doha, team competition, 2nd 
2003, Bangkok, team competition, 2nd 
Asian Games
1998, Bangkok, men's singles, quarter final
1998, Bangkok, men's doubles, semi final
1998, Bangkok, mixed doubles, quarter final
2002, Busan, men's doubles, quarter final
Asian Top-12 Championships
1999, Kish Island, quarter final

External links
 
 
 ITTF stats by player
 
 

Olympic table tennis players of Taiwan
Living people
1979 births
Sportspeople from Tainan
Table tennis players at the 2000 Summer Olympics
Table tennis players at the 2008 Summer Olympics
Asian Games medalists in table tennis
Taiwanese male table tennis players
Table tennis players at the 1998 Asian Games
Table tennis players at the 2002 Asian Games
Table tennis players at the 2006 Asian Games
Medalists at the 1998 Asian Games
Medalists at the 2002 Asian Games
Medalists at the 2006 Asian Games
Asian Games bronze medalists for Chinese Taipei
Universiade medalists in table tennis
Universiade bronze medalists for Chinese Taipei
Medalists at the 2001 Summer Universiade
Medalists at the 2007 Summer Universiade